The Hero Asian Champions Trophy 2018 was held at Muscat, Oman between October 18–28, 2018. It was the fifth edition of the Asian Hockey Champions Trophy, a field hockey tournament for the six best Asian national teams. This was announced by the Asian Hockey Federation (AHF) on 29 January 2018. The Oman Hockey Association hosted the tournament.

The 5th edition of the biennial event took place at the Sultan Qaboos Sports Complex in Muscat, Sultanate of Oman. The tournament featured host nation Oman, Pakistan, Malaysia, India, South Korea, and Japan.

Hero MotoCorp, a global partner of the International Hockey Federation (FIH) and a long-term associate of the Asian Hockey Federation (AHF), were the title sponsor of the tournament.

India and Pakistan were declared joint winners by virtue of forfeiture of the final due to persistent rain. Malaysia finished at the 3rd place after defeating Japan 3-2 in the penalty shootouts in the bronze medal match. Malaysia's Faizal Saari was the top scorer of the tournament with 8 Goals. India remained the only undefeated team in the tournament.

Umpires
A total of nine umpires were appointed by the FIH and National Association to officiate the tournament.

Anand (IND)
Bruce Bale (ENG)
Dong Yoon Shin (KOR)
Jakub Mejzlik (CZE)
Kamran Hussain (PAK)
Khalil Al Balushi (OMA)
Michihiko Watanabe (JPN)
Nazmi Kamaruddin (MAS)
Peter Wright (RSA)

Results
All times are Gulf Standard Time (UTC+04:00)

Round robin

Fifth place game

First to fourth place classification

Semi-finals

Third place game

Final

Statistics

Final standings

Awards
The following individual awards were given at the conclusion of the tournament.

Goalscorers

See also
Field hockey at the 2018 Asian Games – Men's tournament
2018 Women's Asian Champions Trophy

References

Asian Champions Trophy
Asian Champions Trophy
Sport in Muscat, Oman
Asian Champions Trophy
Men's Asian Champions Trophy
International field hockey competitions hosted by Oman
21st century in Muscat, Oman